Ormsetvatnet is a lake in the municipality of Steinkjer in Trøndelag county, Norway. The  lake has a dam at the southern end, the water flows out into the short river Moldelva which flows out into an arm of the Trondheimsfjord.

See also
List of lakes in Norway

References

Steinkjer
Lakes of Trøndelag
Reservoirs in Norway